"Come Get to This" is a song written and recorded by American recording artist Marvin Gaye. It was released as the second single off Gaye's album, Let's Get It On following the success of the title track. Recording sessions for the song first occurred in 1970 when Gaye worked on the song in a demo format while he made What's Going On.

Gaye then shelved the recording for three years before revisiting it as he began assessing the track listing for Let's Get It On. The song was remixed and edited at Motown's Hollywood-based recording studios in 1973. The song's composition and record production was inspired by the Motown Sound of the 1960s and the lyrics reflected a man's joy over the return of an old lover. The strong response from Motown executives upon hearing the song prompted the label to issue the song as the second single as a possible follow-up hit to "Let's Get It On".

The song found major success though modestly compared to "Let's Get It On", reaching #21 on the Billboard Hot 100 and #3 on the Hot Soul Singles chart, selling over a quarter million copies. Gaye performed the song while appearing on Soul Train in 1974. The musician performed the song in its original sound during his 1974-1975 United States tour. Midway through the 1970s, Gaye altered the song as a warm-up to "Let's Get It On" performing it in a seductive blues-oriented style. This alteration would continue to be used until his final US tour in 1983. During a rehearsal of his Belgium concert in 1981, Gaye performed the song in its original version on piano.

According to Billboard, "Come Get to This" "segues from soul to pop and back" within the limits of the song.  Cash Box said that "the easy flow here and super rhythm section hugging Marvin’s vocals will delight his fans."

Among the cover versions of the song included versions by Nancy Wilson on her 1975 album of the same name and Joe covered the song on his 2009 album, Signature.

Personnel
All vocals by Marvin Gaye
Instrumentation by The Funk Brothers and the Detroit Symphony Orchestra

References

1973 singles
Marvin Gaye songs
Nancy Wilson (jazz singer) songs
Joe (singer) songs
Songs written by Marvin Gaye
Song recordings produced by Marvin Gaye